Langset is a basic statistical unit in the sub-area of Nedre Saltdal ('Lower Saltdal') in the municipality of Saltdal in Nordland county, Norway. The area is located north of Rognan and Saksenvik and south of Setså on the east side of Saltdal Fjord (Saltdalsfjorden). European route E6 and the Nordland Line pass through the area.

During the Second World War the Blood Road was built through the area. It was constructed as a new segment of Norwegian National Road 50 between Rognan and Langset, where there was ferry service before the war.

References

Saltdal